The 1895 Centre football team represented Centre College as an independent the 1895 college football season. Led by first-year head coach Harry Anderson, Centre compiled a record of  6–0–1. The team outscored its opponents 184–18.

Schedule

References

Centre
Centre Colonels football seasons
College football undefeated seasons
Centre football